August 27 - Eastern Orthodox liturgical calendar - August 29

All fixed commemorations below are observed on September 10 by Orthodox Churches on the Old Calendar.

For August 28, Orthodox Churches on the Old Calendar commemorate the Saints listed on August 15.

Saints

 Righteous Hezekiah, King of Judah (696 B.C.)
 Righteous Anna the Prophetess, daughter of Phanuel (1st century)  (see also: February 3)
 Holy 33 Martyrs of Heraclea, by fire.
 Martyrs Irene and Sophia, by the sword.  (see also: September 18)
 Martyrs Diomedes and Laurence, shot with arrows after being tied to a tree.
 Hieromartyr Damon.
 Venerable Moses the Black, of Scetis (c. 375)
 Martyr Queen Shushanik (Susanna) of Georgia (475)  (see also: October 17)

Pre-Schism Western saints

 Saint Hermes and Companions, martyrs in Rome under the judge Aurelian (c. 120)
 Saint Pelagius of Constance, a child-martyr put to death in Pannonia during the persecution of Roman Emperor Numerian (c. 283)
 Saint Julian of Auvergne (3rd century)
 Saints Fortunatus, Gaius and Anthes, martyrs near Salerno in Italy under Diocletian  (303)
 Blessed Augustine of Hippo, Bishop of Hippo (430)  (see also: June 15)
 Saint Ambrose, Bishop of Saintes (c. 450)
 Saint Vivianus, Bishop of Saintes and Confessor (c. 460)
 Saint Facundinus, Bishop of Taino in Umbria (c. 620)
 Saint Adelindis, founder of Buchau Abbey (c. 930)
 Saint Gorman, a monk at Reichenau in Germany who became Bishop of Schleswig in Denmark (965)

Post-Schism Orthodox saints

 Saint Amphilochius of the Kiev Caves, Bishop of Vladimir, Volhynia (1122)
 Saint Theodore (in monasticism Theodosius) of the Kiev Caves, Prince of Ostrog in Volhynia (1483)
 Saint Sabbas, founder and Abbot of Krypetsk Monastery (Pskov) (1495)

New martyrs and confessors

 New Hieromartyrs of Zilantov Monastery in Kazan (1918): 
 Archimandrite Sergius (Zaitsev);
 Hieromanoks Laurence (Nikitin) and Seraphim (Kuzmin); 
 Hierodeacon Theodosius (Alexandrov);
 New Monk-martyrs Leontius (Kariagin) and Stephen; 
 Novices George (Timofeev), Hilarion (Pravdin), John (Sretensky), and Sergius (Galin).
 New Hieromartyr Chrysostomos (Kalafatis) of Smyrna, Metropolitan of Smyrna (1922)
 New Hieromartyr Nicholas Georgievsky, Priest (1931)
 New Hieromartyr Basil Sokolsky, Priest (1937)

Other commemorations

 Translation of the relics of Saint Rumwold of Buckingham, infant saint (662)
 Uncovering of the relics (1659) of St. Job of Pochaev, Abbot and Wonderworker of Pochaev (1651)
 Synaxis of the Saints of the Kiev Caves Lavra, whose relics repose in the Far Caves of St. Theodosius.
 Repose of Elder Philaret of Novo-Spassky Monastery (1842)
 Repose of Archbishop Dmitri Royster of Dallas (2011)

Icon gallery

Notes

References

Sources
 August 28 / September 10. Orthodox Calendar (PRAVOSLAVIE.RU).
 September 10 / August 28. Holy Trinity Russian Orthodox Church (A parish of the Patriarchate of Moscow).
 August 28. OCA - The Lives of the Saints.
 The Autonomous Orthodox Metropolia of Western Europe and the Americas (ROCOR). St. Hilarion Calendar of Saints for the year of our Lord 2004. St. Hilarion Press (Austin, TX). p. 64.
 The Twenty-Eighth Day of the Month of August. Orthodoxy in China.
 August 28. Latin Saints of the Orthodox Patriarchate of Rome.
 The Roman Martyrology. Transl. by the Archbishop of Baltimore. Last Edition, According to the Copy Printed at Rome in 1914. Revised Edition, with the Imprimatur of His Eminence Cardinal Gibbons. Baltimore: John Murphy Company, 1916. pp. 260-261.
 Rev. Richard Stanton. A Menology of England and Wales, or, Brief Memorials of the Ancient British and English Saints Arranged According to the Calendar, Together with the Martyrs of the 16th and 17th Centuries. London: Burns & Oates, 1892. pp. 418-424.

 Greek Sources
 Great Synaxaristes:  28 ΑΥΓΟΥΣΤΟΥ. ΜΕΓΑΣ ΣΥΝΑΞΑΡΙΣΤΗΣ.
  Συναξαριστής. 28 Αυγούστου. ECCLESIA.GR. (H ΕΚΚΛΗΣΙΑ ΤΗΣ ΕΛΛΑΔΟΣ).

 Russian Sources
  10 сентября (28 августа). Православная Энциклопедия под редакцией Патриарха Московского и всея Руси Кирилла (электронная версия). (Orthodox Encyclopedia - Pravenc.ru).

August in the Eastern Orthodox calendar